The Bands of the Household Division refer to the grouping of the seven military bands of the Household Division.

Bands 
The bands are:

 Band of the Household Cavalry
Countess of Wessex's String Orchestra
Foot Guards Bands
Band of the Grenadier Guards
Band of the Coldstream Guards
Band of the Scots Guards
 Band of the Irish Guards
 Band of the Welsh Guards

The massed bands numbers around 250 musicians who are members of the Royal Corps of Army Music rather than the named regiments. These are on show in the Changing of the Guard ceremony at Buckingham Palace. Similarly, both the Household Cavalry regiments have their own mounted bands and also their own regimental quick and slow marches.

Trooping the Colour

The Massed Bands and Mounted Band are featured annually at Trooping the Colour. In addition to the occasional pipers that join the bands, the presence of the Bands of the Household Division totals to approximately 400 musicians. It is responsible for performing the Royal Salute (God Save the King), providing music for the inspection of the line, the trooping through the ranks, and the march past in slow and quick time. One of the unique roles it has is the trooping of the band. This occurs once the King is seated, to which the command "Troop!" is given by the Field Officer. Upon hearing the command, three strikes on a bass drum and a playing of one note by the bands give the signal for the Massed Bands to begin. Under the command of the Senior Drum Major, the Massed Bands march and countermarch on Horse Guards Parade in slow and quick time. The slow march music is traditionally the Waltz from Les Huguenots while the quick march is generally a chosen tune. During the quick march, a lone drummer from the Corps of Drums breaks away to post himself just to the right of No. 1 Guard to sound the lone drummer's eight-bar "Drummer's Call". This initiates the Trooping of the Colour phase, by means of signalling the Captain of No. 1 Guard to cede his command to the Subaltern of No. 1 Guard. The call having been sounded, the lone drummer returns to the Massed Bands.

Spinwheel
As the Escort to the Colour slow-marches down the field towards No. 6 Guard to begin their colour trooping, the massed bands perform a maneuver unique to their unit and the Royal Marines known as the anti-clockwise "spinwheel". It is a 90° turn in restricted space, and is the specific responsibility of the Garrison Sergeant Major.

Lieutenant-Colonel Rodney Bashford, Director of Music for the Grenadier Guards from 1960-1970, was quoted as saying the following about on the spinwheel:

''"A 'wheel' is not an easy manoeuvre with even a small body of troops, and with a block of 400 men the normal wheel is impossible. The massed band therefore pivots on its own centre, so that certain outer ranks and files march long distances in a hurry while the centre and inner ranks loiter with extreme intent, or merely mark time. Yet others not only step sideways but backwards as well. This highly complex movement is called a 'spin-wheel', the details of which can be found in no drill book or manual of ceremonial. Its complexity defies description, and if the truth were known, many of the participants know not whither they go or, on arrival, how they got there. The spin-wheel is almost an art form and each performance of it, although similar in essentials, is different in detail. Most of the performers are adjusting their actions to suit the needs of the spin-wheel of the moment, having adjusted their movements quite otherwise on other occasions.

Beating Retreat

The Beating Retreat is a massive gathering of the band's of the Household Division on Horse Guards Parade. It is based on a 16th-century military ceremony in England that was first used to recall nearby patrolling units to their castle. It is held each year, on the Wednesday and Thursday evenings preceding Trooping the Colour, with the Massed Bands, Pipes and Drums and Corps of Drums of the Household Division, supported by The King's Troop and visiting military bands from around the world.

Senior Director of Music
The first bandmaster to be commissioned was Daniel Godfrey of the Grenadier Guards, this being a personal award coming with a Jubilee Medal as part of Queen Victoria’s Golden Jubilee Honours in 1887. In the Foot Guards, personal commissions would later be granted to Lieutenant Colonel John Mackenzie Rogan and Captain Albert Williams. As a result, on 6 June 1914, the term "Director of Music" was introduced to distinguish those with a commissioned rank from warrant officers.

Since 2020, the senior director of music has become known as 'Commanding Officer, Household Division Bands'.

List of Senior Directors of Music since 1914:

See also
Mounted Band of the Household Cavalry
Royal Air Force Music Services
Royal Artillery Band

References

British military bands
Royal Corps of Army Music